Hanna Bunton (born May 7, 1995) is a Canadian ice hockey forward, currently playing with the Calgary section of the PWHPA. She scored the first goal in Vanke Rays history, while they were competing in the CWHL. Along with Brigette Lacquette and Sarah Nurse, Bunton joined them on the cover (dated June 2021) of Elle Canada.

Career 
As a youth player, Bunton played for the Whitby Wolves in the Provincial Women's Hockey League. She finished second overall in rookie scoring in 2011–12, and would finish her junior career with 87 points in 64 PWHL games.

After graduating from high school, she moved to the United States to study and play at Cornell University. Across 125 NCAA games with the university, she would score 87 points. She was named Ivy League Rookie of the Year in 2014 and Ivy League Player of the Year in 2017.

She was drafted 28th overall in the 2017 CWHL Draft by the Vanke Rays. She scored her first CWHL goal in her first game on the 28th of October 2017, the first goal in the franchise's history. She stayed with the team as it merged with Kunlun Red Star ahead of the 2018–19 season, where she would repeat her tally of 26 points in 28 games.

After the collapse of the CWHL in May 2019, she joined the PWHPA. She played for Team Johnston at the Unifor Showcase in September 2019 and took part in the PWHPA Skills Competition ahead of the Toronto Maple Leafs alumni game in January 2020. She was named to the roster of the Calgary section for the 2020–21 season.

International 
Bunton played for Team Canada at the 2013 IIHF World Women's U18 Championship, scoring six points in five games as the country won gold.

Awards and honors

NCAA
ECAC Hockey All-Rookie Team (2014)
Ivy League Rookie of the Year (2014)
Second-Team All-Ivy (2016)
First-Team All-Ivy (2017)
ECAC Hockey Third Team (2017)
Ivy League Player of the Year (2017)

References

External links

1995 births
Living people
Professional Women's Hockey Players Association players
Cornell Big Red women's ice hockey players
Sportspeople from Belleville, Ontario
Vanke Rays players